Coyote Wash may mean:

A watercourse in

Arizona
 Coyote Wash (Whiskey Creek tributary) in the Canyon de Chelly National Monument
 Coyote Wash (Butler Wash tributary)
 Coyote Wash (San Carlos Reservoir, Gila River tributary)
 Coyote Wash (Railroad Wash tributary) 
 Coyote Wash (Delaney Wash tributary) 
 Coyote Wash (Rincon Creek tributary) 
 Coyote Wash (Los Encinos Wash tributary) 
 Coyote Wash (Agua Fria River tributary)
 Coyote Wash (Gila River tributary)

California
 Coyote Wash (California)

Colorado
 Coyote Wash (Highline Lake) 
 Coyote Wash (Marble Wash)
 Coyote Wash (Dolores River)

New Mexico
 Coyote Wash (Chaco River)

Nevada
 Coyote Wash (Parsnip Wash)	
 Coyote Wash (Dry Lake, Lincoln County, Nevada)

Utah
 Coyote Wash (Buckskin Gulch) tributary to Paria River